Sanzai Dam is a gravity dam located in Ehime Prefecture in Japan. The dam is used for flood control, irrigation and water supply. The catchment area of the dam is 29.4 km2. The dam impounds about 30  ha of land when full and can store 6500 thousand cubic meters of water. The construction of the dam was started on 1972 and completed in 1980.

References

Dams in Ehime Prefecture
1980 establishments in Japan